El Medah is a village and rural commune in central-western Mauritania, located in the Adrar Region. It is part of the Aoujeft Department. The village has a date palm grove. The population in the 2013 census was 3900.

References

Communes of Adrar Region